The 2020–21 Delaware Fightin' Blue Hens men's basketball team represented the University of Delaware in the 2020–21 NCAA Division I men's basketball season. The Fightin' Blue Hens, led by fifth-year head coach Martin Ingelsby, play their home games at the Bob Carpenter Center in Newark, Delaware as members of the Colonial Athletic Association.

Previous season
The Fightin' Blue Hens finished the 2019–20 season 22–11, 11–7 in CAA play to finish in a tie for fourth place. They defeated the College of Charleston in the quarterfinals of the CAA tournament, before falling to top seeded Hofstra in the semifinals.

Offseason

Departures

Incoming transfers

Recruiting class of 2020

Roster

Schedule and results 

|-
!colspan=12 style=| Non-conference regular season

|-
!colspan=9 style=| CAA regular season

|-
!colspan=12 style=| CAA tournament
|-

|-

Source

References

Delaware Fightin' Blue Hens men's basketball seasons
Delaware Fightin' Blue Hens
Delaware Fightin' Blue Hens men's basketball
Delaware Fightin' Blue Hens men's basketball